The 2021 Norwegian First Division was the 37th season of the Norwegian First Division, the second-tier Norwegian women's football division, and the 20th season under the current format. The league consisted of 10 teams. The season started on 22 May 2021 and ended on 14 November 2021.

Røa won the league and were thus promoted to the 2022 Toppserien. Grei and Fart were relegated to the 2022 Norwegian Second Division.

Teams

The following ten teams compete in the 1. divisjon:

League table

Results

Top scorers

References

External links
2021 Norwegian First Division at the Norwegian Football Federation 

Norwegian First Division (women) seasons
2
Norway
Norway